Lloyd George Jackson II (born July 23, 1952) is an American lawyer and politician. The son of Lloyd G. Jackson, he also served in the West Virginia Senate. He ran for Governor in 2004, coming in second in the Democratic primary behind Secretary of State Joe Manchin.

References

External links

1952 births
Living people
Democratic Party West Virginia state senators
Politicians from Huntington, West Virginia
West Virginia University alumni